Belontia, sometimes referred to combtail gouramies, is a genus of gouramis, the only genus within the subfamily Belontiinae, native to freshwater habitats in Southeast Asia and Sri Lanka. These are medium sized to large gouramies that are seldom kept in aquariums due to their aggression and relative lack of the color common to the gouramies.

Species
There are currently two recognized species in this genus:
 Belontia hasselti (G. Cuvier, 1831) (Malay combtail)
 Belontia signata (Günther, 1861) (Ceylonese combtail)

References

 
Osphronemidae
Freshwater fish of Asia
Freshwater fish genera
Taxa named by George S. Myers